The Hobart Private Hospital is a 146-bed private hospital located in the central business district of Hobart adjacent to the Royal Hobart Hospital. It is owned by Healthscope, one of Australia's leading providers of hospitals, medical and pathology centres.

The Hobart Private Hospital provides private health care specialising in the areas of emergency, cardiac, maternity, orthopaedics, gastroenterology, urology, plastic and reconstructive surgery, respiratory medicine, rehab and general surgery.

In December 2019, after previous discussions ended in a stalemate, it was announced that the lease to Healthscope would be renewed for another 20 years.

References

External links
 Hobart Private Hospital

Hospital buildings completed in 1999
Hospitals in Hobart
Hospitals established in 1999
1999 establishments in Australia